Gopipur is a village in Suriyawan block Sant Ravidas Nagar district in the Indian state of Uttar Pradesh.

Geography 
It situated at bank of Varuna River. Main occupation of people here is agriculture.

References 

Cities and towns in Bhadohi district